Mary of the United Kingdom may refer to:

* Mary of Teck (1867–1953), queen consort, queen dowager and queen mother of the United Kingdom
 Princess Mary, Duchess of Gloucester and Edinburgh (1776–1857), fourth daughter of King George III
 Mary, Princess Royal and Countess of Harewood (1897–1965), only daughter of King George V

See also
 Mary of England (disambiguation)
 Princess Mary (disambiguation)
 Queen Mary (disambiguation)